Mikhail Vasilyevich Popov (born 24 February 1945 in Tambov Oblast) is a Soviet Russian scientist in the fields of philosophy and economy. Doktor Nauk in Philosophical Sciences (1989), Professor at the Saint Petersburg State University,
Member of the Petrovskaya Academy of Sciences and Arts.
He is a popularizer of Marxism and socialism.

He was a Komsomol member.
Lived in Leningrad (since 1946).
He graduated with honors from the Faculty of Mathematics and Mechanics of Saint Petersburg State University in 1968.

He received the Candidate's degree in 1971.
In 1987, he defended his doctoral dissertation.
In 1995, he received the title of Professor.

From 1971 he worked at the Saint Petersburg State University.

Popov is the author of 9 monographs and more than 300 works.

Member of the Communist Party of the Soviet Union since 1967.
He was assistant to Oleg Shein.

References

Saint Petersburg State University alumni 
Academic staff of Saint Petersburg State University
1945 births
Living people
Russian Marxists
Soviet scientists
Russian economists